Vaporole may refer to:

A brand of smelling salts
A brand of recreational alkyl nitrites